The canton of Banon is a former administrative division in southeastern France. It was disbanded following the French canton reorganisation which came into effect in March 2015. It consisted of 9 communes, which joined the canton of Reillanne in 2015. It had 2,989 inhabitants (2012).

The canton comprised the following communes:

Banon
L'Hospitalet
Montsalier
Redortiers
Revest-des-Brousses
Revest-du-Bion
La Rochegiron
Saumane
Simiane-la-Rotonde

Demographics

See also
Cantons of the Alpes-de-Haute-Provence department

References

Former cantons of Alpes-de-Haute-Provence
2015 disestablishments in France
States and territories disestablished in 2015